The National Insurance Contributions Act 2014 is an Act of the Parliament of the United Kingdom that received Royal Assent on 13 March 2014, after being introduced on 12 October 2013. The act entitled employers to an allowance up to £2,000 against their National Insurance Contributions liability for a tax year.

Overview
The act created an employment allowance for up to £2,000 or an amount equal to the total liabilities to pay secondary Class 1 national insurance contributions (NICs) if lower, for any person or company paying secondary Class 1 NICs for one for more employees, subject to some exceptions.

The allowance specifically does not apply to Public authorities, employers employing a person for purposes connected with the employers personal affairs, service companies or where a businesses has been transferred during the tax year. Where two companies are connected under common control then only one of the companies may claim the allowance.

The allowance is designed to be claimed as a deduction from payments due to Her Majesty's Revenue and Customs (HMRC).

See also
List of Acts of Parliament in the United Kingdom

References

United Kingdom Acts of Parliament 2014
Tax legislation in the United Kingdom
United Kingdom company law
National Insurance